Beaulieu Township is a township in Mahnomen County, Minnesota, United States. The population was 108 at the 2000 census.

Beaulieu Township was named for Henry and John Beaulieu, pioneers who settled there.

Geography

Demographics
As of the census of 2000, there were 108 people, 40 households, and 30 families residing in the township. The population density was 3.2 people per square mile (1.2/km2). There were 47 housing units at an average density of 1.4/sq mi (0.5/km2). The racial makeup of the township was 65.74% White, 30.56% Native American, and 3.70% from two or more races. Hispanic or Latino of any race were 0.93% of the population.

There were 40 households, out of which 17.5% had children under the age of 18 living with them, 55.0% were married couples living together, 12.5% had a female householder with no husband present, and 25.0% were non-families. 20.0% of all households were made up of individuals, and 10.0% had someone living alone who was 65 years of age or older. The average household size was 2.53 and the average family size was 2.90.

In the township the population was spread out, with 22.2% under the age of 18, 10.2% from 18 to 24, 19.4% from 25 to 44, 30.6% from 45 to 64, and 17.6% who were 65 years of age or older. The median age was 44 years. For every 100 females, there were 116.0 males. For every 100 females age 18 and over, there were 115.4 males.

The median income for a household in the township was $37,500, and the median income for a family was $40,357. Males had a median income of $20,179 versus $20,625 for females. The per capita income for the township was $19,659. There were 15.8% of families and 14.5% of the population living below the poverty line, including 16.7% of under eighteens and none of those over 64.

References

Townships in Mahnomen County, Minnesota
Townships in Minnesota